Timo Salonen (born October 8, 1951) is a Finnish former rally driver who won the 1985 World Rally Championship season for Peugeot. It was commented of him that he stood out from other drivers, because he was overweight, wore thick glasses and smoked heavily, but still remained one of the fastest and most competitive drivers in the sport. He was also known for his relaxed attitude and for his habit of steering his rally car with one hand only. These factors led to the nickname Löysä ("Slack").
With his 7 rally wins he remained the most successful driver of Group B era (1983–1986) of WRC.

Career

Salonen achieved his first podium place in the World Rally Championship by driving his Fiat 131 Abarth to second place at the 1977 1000 Lakes Rally. He went on to win the next rally, the 1977 Critérium du Québec, which was only his fifth WRC event and his first outside his home country.

Salonen's factory team career at World Championship level began with Nissan, mainly on long-distance events. In 1984, however, he achieved a string of top-ten finishes, resulting in Jean Todt inviting him to drive for Peugeot in the 1985 season. He began that year playing a supporting role to Ari Vatanen but quickly proved capable of being in a leading role, especially after Vatanen's near-fatal accident in Argentina. Salonen set a record by winning four world rallies in a row – unmatched and unbroken until Sébastien Loeb's six wins in a row in 2005 – and went on to win the World Championship with a record 52-point margin ahead of second-placed Stig Blomqvist. Salonen then remained at Peugeot for the 1986 season, and finished third in the drivers' championship, behind his new team-mate Juha Kankkunen and Lancia driver Markku Alén.

He has remained the most successful driver of Group B with his seven wins and one world champion title.

In the turbulent world of post-Group B rallying, Salonen starred for Mazda, taking a popular win on the 1987 Swedish Rally. His last WRC event in action was the 1992 Rally Portugal in a Mitsubishi Galant VR-4 until he made a one-time comeback at the 2002 Neste Rally Finland. He managed his Peugeot 206 WRC to 14th place overall.

Salonen was mainly co-driven by Seppo Harjanne, who would later go on to achieve even more success with Tommi Mäkinen (the pairing of Tommi Mäkinen and Seppo Harjanne achieved 2 championship titles from 1996 to 1997 by 1 point until Harjanne was replaced by Risto Mannisenmäki from 1998 to 2001). After retiring from rallying, Salonen has worked as the CEO for his car sales company Autotalo Timo Salonen in Finland.

Complete WRC results

WRC victories
{|class="wikitable"
! Number
! Event
! Season
! Co-driver
! Car
|-
| 1
|  5ème Critérium Molson du Québec
| 1977
| Jaakko Markkula
| Fiat 131 Abarth
|-
| 2
|  11th Motogard Rally of New Zealand
| 1980
|rowspan=10 | Seppo Harjanne
| Datsun 160J
|-
| 3
|  13ème Rallye Côte d'Ivoire
| 1981
| Datsun Violet GT
|-
| 4
|  19º Rallye de Portugal Vinho do Porto
|rowspan=5 | 1985
| Peugeot 205 Turbo 16
|-
| 5
|  32nd Acropolis Rally
|rowspan=6 | Peugeot 205 Turbo 16 E2
|-
| 6
|  15th AWA Clarion Rally of New Zealand
|-
| 7
|  5º Marlboro Rally Argentina
|-
| 8
|  35th 1000 Lakes Rally
|-
| 9
|  36th 1000 Lakes Rally
|rowspan=2 | 1986
|-
| 10
|  35th Lombard RAC Rally
|-
| 11
|  37th International Swedish Rally
| 1987
| Mazda 323 4WD
|}

References

External links
Salonen at RallyBase

1951 births
Living people
Finnish rally drivers
World Rally Champions
World Rally Championship drivers
Sportspeople from Helsinki
Peugeot Sport drivers
Nismo drivers